Cordia africana or Sudan teak is a mid-sized,  white-flowered, evergreen tree in the borage family (Boraginaceae), native to Africa. It produces edible fruit, and its wood is used for drums or other carpentry.

Uses
Cordia africana has been used in the manufacture of drums. The Akan Drum which is now in the British Museum was identified as being of African manufacture because it was found to be made from this tree. It is also sometime called Sudan Teak and has been used for flooring, high-quality furniture, window making, interior decking. The wood can be used to manufacture beehives which can be kept in this tree where the bees can live off the plentiful supply of nectar which comes from the flowers. In addition the tree supplies leaves for forage and an edible fruit.

References

Gallery

External links

alliodora
Myrmecophytes
Trees of Africa
Fruits originating in Africa
Plants described in 1792
Trees of Ethiopia